Partridge Island is a Canadian island located in the Bay of Fundy off the coast of Saint John, New Brunswick, within the city's Inner Harbour.

The island is a provincial historic site and was designated a National Historic Site of Canada in 1974. It lies on the west side of the mouth of the Saint John River.

During the American Revolution, in 1780, six British troops from Major Timothy Hierlihy's corps, under the command of Lieut. Wheaton, attacked eight American privateers in a house they were occupying on Partridge island.  The British killed three of the privateers and the other five were taken prisoner.

Partridge Island was first established as a quarantine station and pest house in 1785 by the Saint John Royal Charter, which also set aside the island for use as a navigational aid station and a military post. Its first use as a quarantine station was not until 1816. A hospital was constructed on the island in 1830.

Immigration and memorials
The island received its largest influx of immigrants in the 1840s during the "Great Famine", also known as the "Irish Potato Famine," when a shortage of potatoes occurred due to potato blight striking Ireland's staple crop.  The famine caused millions to starve to death or otherwise emigrate, mainly to North America. During the famine, some 30,000 immigrants were processed by the island's visiting and resident physicians, with 1,196 dying at Partridge Island and the adjacent city of Saint John during the Typhus epidemic of 1847.  During the 1890s there were over 78,000 immigrants a year being examined or treated on the island.

A memorial to the Irish immigrants of the mid-1840s was set up on the island in the 1890s, but by World War One it had deteriorated. In 1926 the Saint John City Cornet Band approached Saint John contractor George McArthur who agreed to lead a campaign to build a suitable monument. The Celtic Cross memorial to the Irish dead of 1847 was dedicated in 1927. This was restored and rededicated in 1985. In the early and mid-1980s, memorials were built by the Saint John Jewish Community, the Loyal Orange Lodge, the Partridge Island Research Project, and the Partridge Island & Harbour Heritage Inc., a company that was registered in 1988 and dissolved in 2004.  The memorials were dedicated to the Protestant, Catholic and Jewish immigrants buried in the six island graveyards.  A monument was also dedicated to all of the Irish dead from 1830 to the 1920s.

History

The island's folklore begins with the Mi'kmaq Nation, who referred to the island as "Quak'm'kagan'ik" meaning "a piece cut out."  This name is in reference to the belief that the island was created when Glooscap smashed the dam that "Big Beaver" had built. At the Reversing Falls Rapids a piece of the dam was swept in the rush of water to the mouth of the harbour where it came to rest to form the island. This version of the legend dates to the early 20th century. The 19th century version refers to Partridge Island in Minas Basin in Nova Scotia.

Following the arrival of the American Loyalists from the American Revolutionary War in 1783, and the formation of the city of Saint John, there was the need for a lighthouse to aid shipping. A light station was erected on Partridge Island and began operating in 1791. It was only the third light station to have been built in British North America. A signal station was soon located on the island and it was used for many years to alert the harbour to vessels approaching from the Bay of Fundy. The island's light and signal station were both established in 1791.

The island was Saint John's principal military fortification from 1800 until 1947. It was the only Saint John fortification to be used during all periods of Saint John's military activity. There are still visible remains of the Royal Artillery gun battery of 1812, and of both the First and Second World Wars.

The island was also home to dozens of island families over the years, from lightkeepers such as Captain Samuel Duffy, James Wilson, Albert Smith, Charles Mitchell and Thomas Furness, to hospital staff such as Doctors George and William Harding, hospital stewards Thomas McGowan, Fred and Jim Hargrove, and teachers for the island's school such as Jean MacCullum and Forbes Elliott.

Boat tours to the island operated from 1982 until 1995 when the island's small museum closed. Public access is now restricted. There have been numerous books written about the island as well as video documentaries.

Efforts to reopen the island

Ambitions to turn Partridge Island into a tourist site have been ongoing. In 2014, the federal government set aside $200,000 for a feasibility study which would assess the cost of repairing the breakwater and creating a walkway that would cross to the island as well as annual operation and maintenance costs. The study found that it would cost between $27-$40 million to create a path to the island.

Wayne Long, MP for Saint John, has proposed that a wharf be built at the site and that boat tours would go to and from it.  Long said in 2017, "The time for action is now" about creating access to the historic island. Long estimates that the wharf would cost only $5 million, which is a sharp reduction from the cost of a walkway.

Before opening to the public, a clean-up of the island's significant soil contaminates would have to be done. All of the remaining buildings on the site have been vandalized or burned. Of the six graveyards, the 19th-century graveyard was almost obliterated by the military during World War II. Less than three dozen graves remain. Many young people from the local area go to the island, although it is illegal to cross the breakwater.

See also
 List of communities in New Brunswick
 List of islands of New Brunswick

References

External links
 Gateway to Canada - Heritage Resources Saint John
 A Chronicle of Irish Immigration to Saint John, New Brunswick, 1847, Elizabeth Cushing, Teresa Casey, Monica Robertson, 1979.
 The Diary of Nellie McGowan, Partridge Island Quarantine Station, 1902, Harold E. Wright, 1984. 
 Fortress Saint John, an illustrated military history, 1640-1985, Harold E. Wright and Byron O'Leary, 1985.
 Dr. James P. Collins, a martyr to his duty, Harold E. Wright, 1988.
 The Irish in Atlantic Canada, 1780-1900, Thomas Power, 1991.
 L'ile Partridge Island, A Gateway to North America/Un passage vers l'Amerique de Nord, Harold E. Wright, 1995.
 Images of Canada, Saint John, Harold E. Wright, 1996.
 Images of Our Past, Homeport: Campobello-Saint John-St. Martins, Harold E. Wright & Deborah Stilwell, 2002.
 Partridge Island Quarantine Station Collection McGill University Library & Archives.

Coastal islands of New Brunswick
Irish diaspora in Canada
Quarantine facilities in Canada
National Historic Sites in New Brunswick
Geography of Saint John County, New Brunswick
Landforms of Saint John County, New Brunswick